Claudio Simonetti (born 19 February 1952) is an Italian musician and film composer. He moved with his family from Brazil to Italy at the age of 11. The keyboardist of the progressive rock band Goblin, Simonetti has specialized in the scores for Italian and American horror films since the 1970s.

A long-time collaborator of director Dario Argento, Simonetti has worked on several of the director/producer's films including Deep Red, Suspiria, Dawn of the Dead, Tenebrae, Phenomena, Demoni, and Opera. His work has long been an iconic staple of Italian genre cinema, collaborating with directors like Ruggero Deodato, Umberto Lenzi, Lucio Fulci, Enzo G. Castellari, Lamberto Bava, and Sergio Martino. His highly experimental scores are known for their signature, electronic and progressive rock-influenced sound, and have been imitated numerous times. He studied at the Conservatorio di Santa Cecilia in Rome.

Biography
The son of composer and entertainer Enrico, he was the keyboard player for the Italian progressive rock band Goblin, which initially formed under the name Cherry Five. He has been influenced by Keith Emerson, Brian Auger, Rick Wakeman and Tony Banks.

Simonetti's film work includes the scores to many popular and cult films such as Conquest (1983), The New Barbarians (1983), Cut and Run (1985), Midnight Killer (1986), Hands of Steel (1986), Body Count (1987), and The Versace Murder (1998).

Beginning in 1978, Simonetti founded a number of electronic disco projects. In 1979, with Giancarlo Meo, he formed perhaps his best-known project behind singer Vivien Vee (Viviana Andreattini), whose song "Give Me a Break" became a minor hit in the American dance charts. Later Vivien Vee tracks, particularly "Blue Disease" from 1983, showcased some of the darker and edgier sounds familiar from the Goblin years. Another project he was involved in was Easy Going, with "Baby I Love You" from 1978, and "Fear" from 1979. In 1983, he was the central member of the Italo disco group Crazy Gang.

In 1999, Simonetti formed the heavy metal band Daemonia, which has recorded updated versions of Goblin favorites in addition to original material. Daemonia has also contributed tracks to U.S. DVD releases of Italian horror movies. He composed the title track "Mater Lacrimarum" for The Mother of Tears soundtrack in 2007, which features background vocals by Dani Filth.

In 2009, Simonetti collaborated with the Los Angeles heavy metal band Rusty Eye. He played keyboard on "Mondo Cane" and "Wings of the Demon" from the album Possessor. On 16 October 2010, Simonetti with his group Daemonia took part in the event Soundtracks – A tribute to Pino Rucher. The event was sponsored by the Municipal Authorities of San Nicandro Garganico and Manfredonia.

Also in 2010, Simonetti reunited with his former Goblin bandmates Massimo Moranti and Maurizio Guarani along with his group Daemonia's rhythm section to form New Goblin. They played several concerts around the world. This lasted until the fall of 2013 when he left New Goblin along with Daemonia's rhythm section to reform Daemonia under the new banner Simonetti's Goblin.

In 2013, he played keyboard on the "Aggregat 4" track from the Simulakrum Lab album, a vintage synthesizers music project created by Paolo Prevosto. 2015 released with the Murder Collections, new arranged version of his film themes, include Profondo Rosso, Suspiria, Tenebrae, and Dawn of the Dead.

Solo filmography

See also
Tenebrae (soundtrack)

References

External links

Official website 

Claudio Simonetti RBMA lecture
The Fantastic Journey of GOBLIN
Official website of Daemonia 

1952 births
Living people
Italian male musicians
Italian male film score composers
Italian people of Brazilian descent
Italian keyboardists
People from São Paulo
Italian Italo disco musicians